The 2018 British motorcycle Grand Prix was the scheduled twelfth round of the 2018 MotoGP season. Planned to be held at the Silverstone Circuit in Silverstone on 26 August 2018, the race was cancelled due to heavy rain.This is the first cancelled MotoGP race since the cancellation of the MotoGP class race during the 2011 Malaysian Grand Prix due to Marco Simoncelli's fatal accident, and also marks for the first time since the 1980 Austrian Grand Prix that racing for all classes was cancelled.

Qualifying
Qualifying was conducted on 25 August 2018, with Jorge Lorenzo on a Ducati taking the MotoGP pole with a time of 2:10.155.  Francesco Bagnaia scored the Moto2 pole at 2:08.153, and Jorge Martín in a Honda claimed the Moto3 pole at 2:13.292, all with inclement weather involved.

Track surface issues
On 9 February 2018, Silverstone Circuit announced the track would be repaved in its entirety for the first time since 1996. Shortly after the track was repaved and opened for testing, Cal Crutchlow said the new surface was perfect to Dorna officials.

Five months later, during the Formula One round at Silverstone in early July, Lewis Hamilton blasted the repaving as "wasted money," calling it the "worst job ever," saying the rough surface was worse than the Nürburgring Nordschleife.  Carlos Sainz, Jr. said the roughness of the surface, especially bumps, were worse after the repaving.

Shortly after the cancellation, MotoGP officials blamed the track's newly repaved surface as the problem. Media reports from various motorsport sites noted the problems since the F1 race and the new tarmac was to blame.

On 8 May 2019, Silverstone announced as part of extending its MotoGP contract to 2021 that the circuit will be repaved again in June, two months before the MotoGP race. The repaving was completed by Tarmac Ltd with the direction of Italian circuit designer Jarno Zaffelli, from Dromo.

Championship standings after the race

MotoGP

Moto2

Moto3

References

British
Motorcycle Grand Prix
British motorcycle Grand Prix
British motorcycle Grand Prix
Motorcycle racing controversies
British motorcycle Grand Prix